St Deiniol's Church may mean:

St Deiniol's Church, Criccieth
St Deiniol's Church, Hawarden
St Deiniol's Church, Itton, Monmouthshire
St Deiniol's Church, Llanddaniel Fab
St Deiniol's Church, Worthenbury, Wrexham County Borough

See also
St Deiniol's Library